Eduardo Masso (born 11 January 1964) is a former tennis professional from Belgium.

Born in Argentina, the left-hander reached his highest ATP singles ranking of World No. 56 in July 1991. Masso's greatest result in singles was reaching the final of Hilversum in 1990 as a qualifier, beating celebrated claycourters Juan Aguilera, Sergi Bruguera and Emilio Sanchez en route. He lost this final being a qualifier and losing against a lucky loser: Francisco Clavet

Masso became a naturalised citizen of Belgium after marrying Sabrina Merckx, the daughter of Eddy Merckx and taking up residence in Brussels They are the parents of Luca Masso, who was part of the Argentinian hockey team that took the gold medal in the 2016 Olympics in the finals against Belgium.

Career finals

Singles (1 runner-up)

References

External links
 
 
 

1964 births
Living people
Belgian male tennis players
Belgian people of Argentine descent
Naturalised citizens of Belgium
Sportspeople from Brussels
People from Córdoba Province, Argentina
20th-century Belgian people